The 2nd Squadron was a squadron of the 1st Air Wing of the Japan Air Self-Defense Force based at Hamamatsu Air Base, in Shizuoka Prefecture, Japan. It was equipped with North American F-86F Sabre aircraft.

History
On August 25, 1956 the squadron was formed at Hamamatsu Air Base in Shizuoka Prefecture. It was responsible for training pilots.

Five of its aircraft formed an aerobatic display unit. This was the predecessor unit to the current Blue Impulse team.

It was disbanded on November 20, 1965, with its duties taken over by 1st Squadron. Squadrons 1-11 were F-86F squadrons.

Aircraft operated

Fighter aircraft
 North American F-86F Sabre（1956-1965）

See also
 Fighter units of the Japan Air Self-Defense Force

References

Units of the Japan Air Self-Defense Force